Peñuelas is a town and municipality in Puerto Rico located in the Peñuelas Valley on the southern coast of the island, south of Adjuntas, east of Guayanilla, west of Ponce and north of the Caribbean Sea. Peñuelas is spread over 12 barrios and Peñuelas Pueblo (the downtown area and the administrative center of the city). It is part of the Yauco Metropolitan Statistical Area. Peñuelas is known as "" (The Güiro Capital) and "" (The Valley of the Royal Poinciana trees). In 2020, Peñuelas had a population of 20,399.

History
In 1754, a group of workers had settled over the Bay of Tallaboa. Later gradually retreated deeper into the valley, heading tobarrios the most fertile land which would then be part of the town of Peñuelas. For the year 1788, approximately 80 families inhabiting the valley, which focused mainly on agriculture and livestock.
Peñuelas Township was founded August 25, 1793 by Diego de Alvarado.

By 1874, the town had been developed and had a population of 9,206, according to a census of that year. The town had four main roads, some streets, a brick church and the town hall, which also served as a prison, barracks and a cemetery.

On March 1, 1902 the Legislative Assembly of Puerto Rico approved a law to consolidate certain municipal districts, so Peñuelas neighborhoods were attached to the municipality of Ponce. In 1905, the same Assembly repealed the law and it became again the municipality.

The first incident of the Puerto Rican Nationalist Party Revolts of the 1950s occurred during the early hours of October 29, 1950, in Peñuelas, when the insular police of that town surrounded the house of the mother of Melitón Muñiz Santos, the president of the Peñuelas Nationalist Party in the bario Macaná, under the pretext that he was storing weapons for the Nationalist Revolt. Without warning, the police fired upon the Nationalists in the house and a firefight between both factions ensued, which resulted on the death of two Nationalists and the wounding of six police officers. Nationalists Meliton Muñoz Santos, Roberto Jaume Rodriguez, Estanislao Lugo Santiago, Marcelino Turell, William Gutirrez and Marcelino Berrios were arrested and accused of participating in an ambush against the local insular police.On September 20, 2017 Hurricane Maria struck the island of Puerto Rico. In Peñuelas, an estimated 1,500 homes were completely destroyed and 500 were partially destroyed. With its winds and rainfall, the hurricane triggered numerous landslides in northern Peñuelas.

Geography
Peñuelas is located on the southern coast, slightly west of the center.

Rivers near Peñuelas include:
Río Guayanés
Río Macaná
Río Tallaboa

Barrios

Like all municipalities of Puerto Rico, Peñuelas is subdivided into barrios.

Barreal
Coto
Cuebas
Encarnación
Jaguas
Macaná
Peñuelas barrio-pueblo
Quebrada Ceiba
Rucio
Santo Domingo
Tallaboa Alta
Tallaboa Poniente
Tallaboa Saliente

Within barrios are communities: For example, the Santo Domingo  ('community') in Santo Domingo barrio and the Tallaboa community in the barrio of Encarnación.

Sectors
Barrios (which are roughly comparable to minor civil divisions) and subbarrios, in turn, are further subdivided into smaller local populated place areas/units called  (sectors in English). The types of sectores may vary, from normally sector to urbanización to reparto to barriada to residencial, among others.

Special Communities

 (Special Communities of Puerto Rico) are marginalized communities whose citizens are experiencing a certain amount of social exclusion. A map shows these communities occur in nearly every municipality of the commonwealth. Of the 742 places that were on the list in 2014, the following barrios, communities, sectors, or neighborhoods were in Peñuelas: Maldonado neighborhood (Los Chinos), Santo Domingo barrio, Comunidad Caracoles, and Comunidad La Moca in Tallaboa Alta.

Demographics
Puerto Rico was ceded by Spain in the aftermath of the Spanish–American War under the terms of the Treaty of Paris of 1898 and became a territory of the United States. In 1899, the United States conducted its first census of Puerto Rico finding that the population of Peñuelas was 12,129.

Tourism
Landmarks and places of interest
There are 15 beaches in Peñuelas.
The main attractions in Peñuelas are:
Charco La Soplaera (a natural water pool)
El Convento Cave
Don Angel Pacheco Monument
Guilarte Forest
Unknown Soldier's Monument
Parque de Bombas (the old firehouse)
 is an 0-4-2T Baldwin Steam Locomotive on display in the main town square
Peñuelas Museum of Art and History
Cancha Carlos Rentas Gallardo (Quebrada Ceiba)

Economy
Industry
Manufacturing, refinery.

Government

Like all municipalities in Puerto Rico, Peñuelas is administered by a mayor. The current mayor is Gregory Gonsález Souchet, from the Popular Democratic Party (PPD). Gonsález was elected at a special election in 2018 after the incumbent Walter Torres Maldonado stepped down from the mayoral position.

The city belongs to the Puerto Rico Senatorial district V, which is represented by two Senators. In 2012, Ramón Ruiz and Martín Vargas Morales, from the Popular Democratic Party, were elected as District Senators.

Symbols
The  has an official flag and coat of arms.

Flag
It has a rectangular bottom in canary yellow and stands for the sun, symbol of the physical life. In the center it has a purple or violet cross: symbol of Christianity and its ecclesiastical order; it represents the spiritual life. The cross purple extends to all the points of the yellow rectangle.

Coat of arms
The adornment above the shield, a stone wall, represents the perpetuity. The cross represents Santo Cristo de la Salud that "stopped the sea from flooding Peñuelas". The purple arm represents the priesthood and the town of Peñuelas. The canary yellow represents the sun. The blue and white symbolize the choppy sea and the regal ensign represents the faith in Christianity, "In God We Trust''".

Culture

Festivals and events
Peñuelas celebrates its patron saint festival in late October / early November. The  is a religious and cultural celebration that generally features parades, games, artisans, amusement rides, regional food, and live entertainment.

Other festivals and events celebrated in Peñuelas include:
 Endless Fun Festival – April
 Festival of the Cross – May
 National Güiro Festival – May
 Festival of the Flamboyan Tree – Summer
 Children's Festival – August
 Folk Festival – October
 The Cantatas – December

Sports
Peñuelas AA Amateur Baseball team is called Los Petroleros de Peñuelas (The Peñuelas' Oilers.) The origin of this name dates back to the days when Peñuelas was home to a major petro-chemical complex known as CORCO. Although CORCO closed operations in 1980, the name stuck throughout the years.

Also known as Luis "Tite" Arroyo's hometown, a baseball hero.
Another hometown hero is Ivelisse Echevarria, who was inducted into the International Federation Softball Hall of Fame in 2003 and is considered by many to be the greatest softball pitcher born in Puerto Rico. Myrian "Betty" Segarra, who was inducted into the International Federation Softball Hall of Fame in 2003 and the best first base in the woman softball in Puerto Rico.

Transportation
Peñuelas' public bus service ("la guagua") connects passengers to Ponce city (east) and Guayanilla (west).

There are 24 bridges in Peñuelas.

Education
6 Elementary schools, 4 Intermediate Schools, 1 High School

See also

List of Puerto Ricans
History of Puerto Rico
Did you know-Puerto Rico?

References

External links
 Puerto Rico Government Directory - Peñuelas

Municipalities of Puerto Rico
Populated places established in 1793
Yauco metropolitan area